On the evening of 18 November 1997, South African military attaché McGill Alexander and his family were taken hostage for approximately twenty-one hours by wanted fugitive  in their home in Taipei, Taiwan. Chen forcibly entered the Alexanders' home at approximately 7:00 pm (Taiwan time) that evening. Chen was captured the following day and executed roughly two years later.

Background
Chen Chin-hsing had been involved in the murder of Pai Hsiao-yen, the daughter of famed Taiwanese actress Pai Bing-bing. His wife and two other relatives were imprisoned for their alleged involvement in the murder while he was on the run.

Incident
At around 7:00 pm Taiwan time, Chen Chin-hsing forcibly entered the Alexander house via the garage. The first person to see him was McGill Alexander's twelve-year-old daughter, Christine, who was playing the piano at the time. Chen put his arm around her neck, and forced her to walk upstairs, where the rest of the family was. Chen instructed Daughter, Melanie Alexander at gunpoint to call CNN. She phoned her friend Michael, who worked at CNN. Within an hour, media were alerted to the situation and police officers surrounded the house.

As police surrounded the house, they reportedly taunted Chen. As the police advanced towards the house, after Chen had warned them to stay away, Chen opened fire with one of his guns. The other one was kept pointed at Melanie, whom he was using as a human shield. After repeated begging by Mr Alexander, Chen released Melanie and instead took Mr Alexander as a human shield. By this point, the police had entered the house via the garage door. Chen fired shots at the policemen surging up the stairs to his position, and they retreated to the garage. As Chen was firing at police, one of his shots went through Melanie's wrist and into her back, lodging between two arteries in her pelvis. Mr. Alexander was also shot in the leg.

Negotiations
Chen had promised to release the hostages if Frank Hsieh, a renowned politician (later premier), personally came to negotiate the release of his wife and brother. At 9:00 pm Taiwan time, Frank Hsieh arrived. Negotiations started at 10:00 with success in ensuring the release of Mr Alexander and his daughter Melanie for treatment of their wounds sustained. Further negotiations ended in the release of the family's foster son and Christine. Mrs. Alexander was the last hostage released by Chen. The release of Mrs Alexander on 19 November 1997 brought an end to the crisis. Police announced an end to the crisis at 4:00 pm.

Capture and execution of Chen
After the hostages were released, police seized Chen. Chen was found guilty on charges including sexual assault, kidnapping, and murder and executed on 6 October 1999.

Aftermath
After the event, the Alexanders publicly forgave Chen before his execution. Additionally, as a longstanding result of the crisis, Taiwanese police developed better tactics to combat hostage situations.

Mr Alexander wrote a book about the event, Hostage in Taipei, which was published by Cladach Publishing in 2000. It was translated into Chinese the following year as True Love, and published by Cosmax.

Sources

Further reading

Hostage taking
1997 crimes in Taiwan
South Africa–Taiwan relations
Diplomatic incidents